The Road to Freedom  is a 2010 war film and the directorial debut of Brendan Moriarty. The film is inspired by the true-life story of photojournalist Sean Flynn, the son of Errol Flynn, who disappeared with fellow photojournalist Dana Stone in Cambodia in 1970. Joshua Fredric Smith portrays Sean and Scott Maguire portrays Dana.

The world premiere at the Cannes Film Market was on April 27, 2010. It was released in theaters in the United States on Sep 30th 2011 and was Rated R by the Motion Picture Association. In July 2011, Creative Freedom acquired the United States distribution rights and released the film on September 30, 2011.

Plot
Two photojournalists, Sean (Joshua Fredric Smith) and  Dana (Scott Maguire), brave the jungles to get their story of war-torn Cambodia in 1970 when they are captured by Khmer Rouge guerrillas.

Cast
Joshua Fredric Smith as Sean 
Scott Maguire as Dana
Tom Proctor as Francias
Nhem Sokun as Lim Po
Nhem Sokunthol as General
Kanilen Kang as Mean
Robert Malone as Lewis

External links

References

 https://www.amazon.com/Road-Freedom-Year-Zero/dp/B01K13RZZ8/ref=sr_1_1?ie=UTF8&qid=1481312067&sr=8-1&keywords=the+road+to+freedom+year+zero

2010 films
American war films
Films set in Cambodia
Films set in the 1970s
Films about the Cambodian genocide
Biographical films about photojournalists
Biographical films about war correspondents
2010s American films